

Peerage of England

|rowspan="2"|Earl of Surrey (1088)||John de Warenne, 6th Earl of Surrey||1240||1304||Died
|-
|John de Warenne, 7th Earl of Surrey||1304||1347||
|-
|Earl of Warwick (1088)||Guy de Beauchamp, 10th Earl of Warwick||1298||1315||
|-
|Earl of Gloucester (1122)||Gilbert de Clare, 8th Earl of Gloucester||1295||1314||
|-
|rowspan="2"|Earl of Arundel (1138)||Richard FitzAlan, 8th Earl of Arundel||1272||1302||Died
|-
|Edmund FitzAlan, 9th Earl of Arundel||1302||1326||
|-
|Earl of Norfolk (1140)||Roger Bigod, 5th Earl of Norfolk||1270||1306||Died, title extinct
|-
|Earl of Oxford (1142)||Robert de Vere, 6th Earl of Oxford||1297||1331||
|-
|Earl of Salisbury (1145)||Margaret de Lacy, 4th Countess of Salisbury||1261||1310||
|-
|Earl of Hereford (1199)||Humphrey de Bohun, 4th Earl of Hereford||1298||1322||
|-
|Earl of Lincoln (1217)||Henry de Lacy, 3rd Earl of Lincoln||1266||1310||
|-
|Earl of Cornwall (1225)||Edmund, 2nd Earl of Cornwall||1272||1300||Died, title extinct
|-
|Earl of Pembroke (1247)||Aymer de Valence, 2nd Earl of Pembroke||1296||1324||
|-
|Earl of Leicester (1265)||Thomas Plantagenet, 2nd Earl of Leicester and Lancaster||1296||1322||
|-
|Earl of Richmond (1268)||John II, Duke of Brittany||1268||1305||Died, the Earldom reverted to the Crown
|-
|Earl of Chester (1301)||Edward of Caernarvon, Earl of Chester||1301||1307||New creation; succeeded to the Throne, and the title merged in the Crown
|-
|Earl of Richmond (1306)||John of Brittany, Earl of Richmond||1306||1334||New creation; also created Baron of Brittany in 1305
|-
|Earl of Cornwall (1307)||Piers Gaveston, 1st Earl of Cornwall||1307||1312||New creation
|-
|Baron de Ros (1264)||William de Ros, 1st Baron de Ros||1285||1316||
|-
|Baron le Despencer (1264)||Hugh le Despencer, 2nd Baron le Despencer||1265||1326||
|-
|Baron Basset of Drayton (1264)||Ralph Basset, 2nd Baron Basset of Drayton||1299||1343||
|-
|rowspan="2"|Baron Basset of Sapcote (1264)||Simon Basset, 2nd Baron Basset of Sapcote||1282||1300||Died
|-
|Ralph Basset, 3rd Baron Basset of Sapcote||1300||1326||Never summoned to Parliament
|-
|Baron Mowbray (1283)||John de Mowbray, 2nd Baron Mowbray||1297||1322||
|-
|Baron Hastings (1290)||John Hastings, 1st Baron Hastings||1290||1313||
|- 
|rowspan="2"|Baron Astley (1295)||Andrew of Astley, 1st Baron Astley||1295||1301||Died
|- 
|Nicholas de Astley, 2nd Baron Astley||1301||1314||
|- 
|Baron Beke (1295)||John Beke, 1st Baron Beke||1295||1304||Died; Barony fell into abeyance
|- 
|Baron Berkeley (1295)||Thomas de Berkeley, 1st Baron Berkeley||1295||1321||
|- 
|Baron Boteler (1295)||William le Boteler, 1st Baron Boteler||1295||1328||
|- 
|rowspan="2"|Baron Brus (1295)||Robert de Brus, 1st Baron Brus||1295||1304||Died
|- 
|Robert de Brus, 2nd Baron Brus||1304||1306||His estates in England had been taken into the King's hand
|- 
|rowspan="2"|Baron Canville (1295)||Geoffrey de Canville, 1st Baron Canville||1295||1308||Died
|- 
|William de Canville, 2nd Baron Canville||1308||1338||
|- 
|Baron Clavering (1295)||Robert FitzRoger, 1st Baron Clavering||1295||1310||
|- 
|rowspan="2"|Baron Corbet (1295)||Peter Corbet, 1st Baron Corbet||1295||1300||Died
|- 
|Piers Corbet, 2nd Baron Corbet||1300||1322||
|- 
|rowspan="2"|Baron Fauconberg (1295)||Walter de Fauconberg, 1st Baron Fauconberg||1295||1304||Died
|- 
|Walter de Fauconberg, 2nd Baron Fauconberg||1304||1318||
|- 
|Baron FitzAlan (1295)||Brian FitzAlan, 1st Baron FitzAlan||1295||1305||Died, title fell into abeyance
|- 
|Baron FitzWalter (1295)||Robert FitzWalter, 1st Baron FitzWalter||1295||1325||
|- 
|Baron FitzWarine (1295)||Fulke FitzWarine, 1st Baron FitzWarine||1295||1315||
|- 
|Baron FitzWilliam (1295)||Ralph FitzWilliam, 1st Baron FitzWilliam||1295||1315||
|- 
|Baron Giffard (1295)||John Giffard, 2nd Baron Giffard||1299||1322||
|- 
|rowspan="2"|Baron Grey de Wilton (1295)||Reginald de Grey, 1st Baron Grey de Wilton||1295||1308||Died
|- 
|John Grey, 2nd Baron Grey de Wilton||1308||1323||
|-
|Baron Greystock (1295)||John de Greystock, 1st Baron Greystock||1295||1306||Died, title extinct
|- 
|Baron Huntercombe (1295)||Walter de Huntercombe, 1st Baron Huntercombe||1295||1312||
|- 
|Baron Hussee (1295)||Henry Hussee, 1st Baron Hussee||1295||1332||
|- 
|Baron Hylton (1295)||Robert Hylton, 1st Baron Hylton||1295||1322||
|- 
|rowspan="2"|Baron Knovill (1295)||Bogo de Knovill, 1st Baron Knovill||1295||1306||Died
|- 
|Bogo de Knovill, 2nd Baron Knovill||1306||1338||
|- 
|Baron Kyme (1295)||Philip de Kyme, 1st Baron Kyme||1295||1323||
|- 
|Baron Martin (1295)||William Martin, 1st Baron Martin||1295||1325||
|- 
|Baron Mauley (1295)||Peter de Mauley, 1st Baron Mauley||1295||1310||
|- 
|Baron Meinill (1295)||Nicholas Meinill, 2nd Baron Meinill||1299||1322||
|- 
|Baron Montfort (1295)||John of Montfort||1296||1314||
|- 
|rowspan="2"|Baron Mortimer of Wigmore (1295)||Edmund Mortimer, 1st Baron Mortimer de Wigmore||1295||1304||Died
|- 
|Roger Mortimer, 2nd Baron Mortimer de Wigmore||1304||1330||
|- 
|Baron Neville de Raby (1295)||Ralph Neville, 1st Baron Neville de Raby||1295||1331||
|- 
|Baron Plugenet (1295)||Alan de Plugenet, 2nd Baron Plugenet||1299||1326||
|- 
|rowspan="2"|Baron Poyntz (1295)||Hugh Poyntz, 1st Baron Poyntz||1295||1308||Died
|- 
|Nicholas Poyntz, 2nd Baron Poyntz||1308||1311||
|- 
|Baron Segrave (1295)||John Segrave, 2nd Baron Segrave||1295||1325||
|- 
|Baron Segrave of Barton Segrave (1295)||Nicholas de Segrave, 1st Baron Segrave of Barton Segrave||1295||1322||
|- 
|Baron Strange (1295)||Roger Le Strange, 1st Baron Strange||1295||1311||
|- 
|rowspan="2"|Baron Tateshall (1295)||Robert de Tateshall, 2nd Baron Tateshall||1298||1303||Died
|- 
|Robert de Tateshall, 3rd Baron Tateshall||1303||1306||Died, title extinct
|- 
|rowspan="2"|Baron Umfraville (1295)||Gilbert de Umfraville, 1st Baron Umfraville||1295||1307||Died
|- 
|Robert de Umfraville, 2nd Baron Umfraville||1307||1325||
|- 
|rowspan="2"|Baron Verdun (1295)||Theobald de Verdun, 1st Baron Verdun||1295||1309||Died
|- 
|Theobald de Verdun, 2nd Baron Verdun||1309||1316||
|- 
|rowspan="2"|Baron Wake (1295)||John Wake, 1st Baron Wake||1295||1300||Died
|- 
|Thomas Wake, 2nd Baron Wake of Liddell||1300||1349||
|- 
|Baron Ap-Adam (1299)||John Ap-Adam, 1st Baron Ap-Adam||1299||1311||
|- 
|rowspan="2"|Baron Bardolf (1299)||Hugh Bardolf, 1st Baron Bardolf||1299||1304||Died
|- 
|Thomas Bardolf, 2nd Baron Bardolf||1304||1328||
|- 
|Baron Basset of Weldon (1299)||Richard Basset, 1st Baron Basset of Weldon||1299||1314||
|- 
|Baron Chaurces (1299)||Thomas de Chaurces, 1st Baron Chaurces||1299||1315||
|- 
|Baron Clinton (1299)||John de Clinton, 1st Baron Clinton||1299||1310||
|- 
|Baron de la Mare (1299)||John De La Mare, 1st Baron de la Mare||1299||1316||
|- 
|Baron De La Warr (1299)||Roger la Warr, 1st Baron De La Warr||1299||1320||
|- 
|Baron Deincourt (1299)||Edmund Deincourt, 1st Baron Deincourt||1299||1327||
|- 
|Baron Devereux (1299)||William Devereux, Baron Devereux of Lyonshall||1299||1314||
|- 
|Baron Engaine (1299)||John Engaine, 1st Baron Engaine||1299||1322||
|- 
|Baron Ferrers of Chartley (1299)||John de Ferrers, 1st Baron Ferrers of Chartley||1299||1312||
|- 
|Baron FitzPayne (1299)||Robert FitzPayne, 1st Baron FitzPayne||1299||1316||
|- 
|Baron Genevill (1299)||Geoffrey de Genevill, 1st Baron Genevill||1299||1307||Died, Barony became dormant
|- 
|Baron Grandison (1299)||William de Grandison, 1st Baron Grandison||1299||1335||
|- 
|Baron Hache (1299)||Eustace de Hache, 1st Baron Hache||1299||1306||Died; title extinct
|- 
|Baron Havering (1299)||John de Havering, 1st Baron Havering||1299||1329||
|- 
|Baron Lancaster (1299)||Henry Plantagenet, 1st Baron Lancaster||1299||1345||
|- 
|Baron Leyburn (1299)||William de Leyburn, 1st Baron Leyburn||1299||1310||
|- 
|Baron Lovel (1299)||John Lovel, 1st Baron Lovel||1299||1311||
|- 
|rowspan="2"|Baron Moels (1299)||John de Moels, 1st Baron Moels||1299||1309||Died
|- 
|Nicholas de Moels, 2nd Baron Moels||1309||1315||
|- 
|Baron Mohun (1299)||John de Mohun, 1st Baron Mohun||1299||1330||
|- 
|Baron Mortimer of Chirke (1299)||Roger de Mortimer, 1st Baron Mortimer of Chirke||1299||1336||
|- 
|Baron Mortimer of Richard's Castle (1299)||Hugh de Mortimer, 1st Baron Mortimer of Richard's Castle||1299||1304||Died; Barony fell into abeyance
|- 
|Baron Multon of Egremont (1299)||Thomas de Multon, 1st Baron Multon of Egremont||1299||1322||
|- 
|Baron Muncy (1299)||Walter de Muncy, 1st Baron Muncy||1299||1308||Died; title extinct
|- 
|Baron Percy (1299)||Henry Percy, 1st Baron Percy||1299||1315||
|- 
|Baron Peyvre (1299)||Johny Peyvre, 1st Baron Peyvre||1299||1316||
|- 
|Baron Pinkeny (1299)||Henry de Pinkeney, 1st Baron Pinkeney||1299||1301||Died; Barony extinct
|- 
|Baron Plessets (1299)||Hugh de Plessets, 1st Baron Plessets||1295||1301||Died; none of his heirs were summoned to the Parliament
|- 
|Baron Rivers of Ongar (1299)||John Rivers, 1st Baron Rivers||1299||1311||
|- 
|Baron Saint Amand (1299)||Almaric de St Amand, 1st Baron Saint Amand||1299||1310||
|- 
|rowspan="2"|Baron Scales (1299)||Robert de Scales, 1st Baron Scales||1299||1305||Died
|- 
|Robert de Scales, 2nd Baron Scales||1305||1324||
|- 
|rowspan="2"|Baron Stafford (1299)||Edmund de Stafford, 1st Baron Stafford||1299||1309||Died
|- 
|Ralph de Stafford, 2nd Baron Stafford||1309||1372||
|- 
|rowspan="2"|Baron Tregoz (1299)||John de Tregoz, 1st Baron Tregoz||1299||1300||Died; Barony in abeyance 1301-1305
|- 
|Henry de Tregoz, 2nd Baron Tregoz||1305||1318||
|- 
|rowspan="2"|Baron Teyes (1299)||Henry de Teyes, 1st Baron Teyes||1299||1308||Died
|- 
|Henry de Teyes, 2nd Baron Teyes||1308||1321||
|- 
|Baron Valence (1299)||Aymer de Valence, 1st Baron Valence||1299||1323||
|- 
|Baron Vavasour (1299)||William de Vavasour, 1st Baron Vavasour||1299||1313||
|- 
|Baron Vere (1299)||Hugh de Vere, 1st Baron Vere||1299||1318||
|- 
|Baron Welles (1299)||Adam de Welles, 1st Baron Welles||1299||1311||
|- 
|Baron Zouche (1299)||Alan la Zouche, 1st Baron la Zouche of Ashby||1299||1314||
|- 
|Baron Toni (1299)||Robert de Toni, 1st Baron Toni||1299||1310||
|- 
|Baron Grandison (1299)||Otho de Grandison, 1st Baron Grandison||1299||1305?||Died; title extinct
|- 
|Baron Beauchamp of Somerset (1299)||John de Beauchamp, 1st Baron Beauchamp||1299||1336||
|- 
|Baron Braose (1299)||William de Braose, 1st Baron Braose||1299||1326||
|- 
|rowspan="2"|Baron Cauntelo (1299)||William de Cauntelo, 1st Baron Cauntelo||1299||1308||Died
|- 
|William de Cauntelo, 2nd Baron Cauntelo||1308||1321||
|- 
|Baron Chavent (1299)||Piers de Chavent, 1st Baron Chavent||1299||1303||Died; none of his heirs were summoned to the Parliament
|- 
|Baron de Clifford (1299)||Robert de Clifford, 1st Baron de Clifford||1299||1314||
|- 
|Baron Darcy (1299)||Philip Darcy, Baron Darcy||1299||1332||
|- 
|rowspan="2"|Baron De La Ward (1299)||Robert de La Ward, 1st Baron De La Ward||1299||1307||Died
|- 
|Simon de La Ward, 2nd Baron De La Ward||1307||1324||
|- 
|Baron Ferrers of Groby (1299)||William Ferrers, 1st Baron Ferrers of Groby||1299||1325||
|- 
|Baron FitzReginald (1299)||John FitzReginald, 1st Baron FitzReginald||1299||1310||
|- 
|Baron Furnivall (1299)||Thomas de Furnivall, 1st Baron Furnivall||1299||1332||
|- 
|Baron Grendon (1299)||Ralph Grendon, 1st Baron Grendon||1299||1331||
|- 
|Baron Hastings of Inchmahome (1299)||Edmund Hastings, 1st Baron Hastings of Inchmahome||1299||1314||
|- 
|Baron Lancaster (1299)||John de Lancastre, 1st Baron Lancaster||1299||1334||
|- 
|Baron Lansladron (1299)||Serlo de Lansladron, 1st Baron Lansladron||1299||1306||Died, title extinct
|- 
|Baron Latimer (1299)||Thomas Latimer, 1st Baron Latimer||1299||1334||
|- 
|rowspan="2"|Baron Latimer (1299)||William Latimer, 1st Baron Latimer||1299||1305||Died
|- 
|William Latimer, 2nd Baron Latimer||1305||1327||
|- 
|rowspan="2"|Baron Lisle (1299)||John de Lisle, 1st Baron Lisle||1299||1304||Died
|- 
|John de Lisle, 2nd Baron Lisle||1304||1337||
|- 
|Baron Montagu (1299)||Simon de Montacute, 1st Baron Montagu||1299||1316||
|- 
|Baron Morley (1299)||William de Morley||1299||1310||
|- 
|Baron Paynel (1299)||John Paynel, 1st Baron Paynel||1299||1318||
|- 
|Baron Pecche (1299)||Gilbert Peche||1299||1322||
|- 
|Baron Rithre (1299)||William de Rithre, 1st Baron Rithre||1299||1310||
|- 
|Baron Roche (1299)||Thomas de la Roche, 1st Baron Roche||1299||1320||
|- 
|Baron Saint John of Basing (1299)||John St John, 1st Baron Saint John of Basing||1299||1329||
|- 
|Baron Saint John of Lageham (1299)||John St John, 1st Baron Saint John of Lageham||1299||1317||
|- 
|Baron Sampson (1299)||William Sampson, 1st Baron Sampson||1299||1306?||Died
|- 
|rowspan="2"|Baron Strange of Knockyn (1299)||John le Strange, 1st Baron Strange of Knockyn||1299||1309||Died
|- 
|John le Strange, 2nd Baron Strange of Knockyn||1309||1311||
|- 
|Baron Sudeley (1299)||John de Sudeley, 1st Baron Sudeley||1299||1336||
|- 
|Baron Tuchet (1299)||William Touchet, 1st Baron Touchet||1299||1306||Died
|- 
|Baron Balliol (1300)||Alexander de Balliol, 1st Baron Balliol||1300||c. 1311||New creation
|- 
|Baron Ferrers of Groby (1300)||William Ferrers, 1st Baron Ferrers of Groby||1300||1325||New creation
|- 
|Baron Burghersh (1300)||Robert de Burgersh, 1st Baron Burgersh||1300||1325||New creation; Died; none of his heirs were summoned to the Parliament
|- 
|Baron Paynel (1303)||William Paynel, 1st Baron Paynel||1303||1317||New creation
|- 
|Baron Grendon (1305)||Robert de Grendon, 1st Baron Grendon||1305||13??||New creation; nothing further is known of him
|- 
|Baron Botetourt (1305)||John de Botetourt, 1st Baron Botetourt||1305||1324||New creation
|- 
|Baron Multon of Gilsland (1307)||Thomas de Multon, 1st Baron Multon of Gilsland||1307||1313||New creation
|- 
|Baron Thweng (1307)||Marmaduke de Thweng, 1st Baron Thweng||1307||1323||New creation
|- 
|Baron Boteler of Wemme (1308)||William Le Boteler, 1st Baron Boteler of Wemme||1308||1334||New creation
|- 
|Baron Cromwell (1308)||John de Cromwell, 1st Baron Cromwell||1308||1335||New creation
|- 
|Baron Grelle (1308)||Thomas de Grelle, 1st Baron Grelle||1308||1347||New creation
|- 
|Baron Somery (1308)||John de Somery, 1st Baron Somery||1308||1321||New creation
|- 
|Baron Zouche of Haryngworth (1308)||William la Zouche, 1st Baron Zouche||1308||1352||New creation
|- 
|Baron Marshal (1309)||William Marshal, 1st Baron Marshal||1309||1314||New creation
|- 
|Baron Ufford (1309)||Robert de Ufford, 1st Baron Ufford||1309||1316||New creation
|- 
|Baron Beaumont (1309)||Henry Beaumont, 1st Baron Beaumont||1309||1340||New creation
|- 
|Baron Cailly (1309)||Thomas de Cailly, 1st Baron Cailly||1309||1317||New creation
|- 
|Baron Everingham (1309)||Adam Everingham, 1st Baron Everingham||1309||1341||New creation
|- 
|Baron FitzHenry (1309)||Aucher FitzHenry, 1st Baron FitzHenry||1309||1339||New creation
|- 
|Baron Gorges (1309)||Ralph de Gorges, 1st Baron Gorges||1309||1324||New creation
|- 
|Baron Monthermer (1309)||Ralph de Monthermer, 1st Baron Monthermer||1309||1325||New creation
|- 
|Baron Orreby (1309)||John de Orreby, 1st Baron Orreby||1309||1318||New creation
|- 
|Baron Strange of Blackmere (1309)||Fulk le Strange, 1st Baron Strange of Blackmere||1309||1324||New creation
|- 
|Baron Thorpe (1309)||John de Thorpe, 1st Baron Thorpe||1309||1325||New creation
|- 
|Baron Badlesmere (1309)||Bartholomew de Badlesmere, 1st Baron Badlesmere||1309||1322||New creation
|- 
|Baron Clare (1309)||Richard de Clare, 1st Baron Clare||1309||1318||New creation
|- 
|}

Peerage of Scotland

|rowspan=2|Earl of Mar (1114)||Gartnait, Earl of Mar||1292||1305||Died
|-
|Domhnall II, Earl of Mar||1305||1332||
|-
|rowspan=2|Earl of Dunbar (1115)||Patrick IV, Earl of March||1289||1308||Died
|-
|Patrick V, Earl of March||1308||1368||
|-
|rowspan=2|Earl of Angus (1115)||Gilbert de Umfraville, Earl of Angus||1246||1307||Died
|-
|Robert de Umfraville, Earl of Angus||1307||1314||
|-
|rowspan=2|Earl of Atholl (1115)||John of Strathbogie, Earl of Atholl||1270||1306||Executed, and the title forfeited
|-
|David II Strathbogie, Earl of Atholl||1307||1314||Title restored
|-
|Earl of Buchan (1115)||John Comyn, Earl of Buchan||1289||1308||Title forfeited
|-
|Earl of Strathearn (1115)||Maol Íosa III, Earl of Strathearn||1271||1317||
|-
|Earl of Fife (1129)||Donnchadh IV, Earl of Fife||1288||1353||
|-
|rowspan=3|Earl of Menteith (1160)||Alexander, Earl of Menteith||1295||1305||Died
|-
|Alan, Earl of Menteith||1305||1308||Died
|-
|Muireadhach III, Earl of Menteith||1308||1333||
|-
|Earl of Lennox (1184)||Maol Choluim II, Earl of Lennox||1291||1333||
|-
|Earl of Carrick (1184)||Robert Bruce, Earl of Carrick||1292||1306||Became King, and his dignities lapsed to the Crown
|-
|Earl of Ross (1215)||Uilleam II, Earl of Ross||1274||1333||
|-
|rowspan=2|Earl of Sutherland (1235)||William de Moravia, 2nd Earl of Sutherland||1248||1307||Died
|-
|William de Moravia, 3rd Earl of Sutherland||1307||1325||
|-
|}

Peerage of Ireland

|Earl of Ulster (1264)||Richard Óg de Burgh, 2nd Earl of Ulster||1271||1326||
|-
|rowspan=2|Baron Athenry (1172)||Peter de Bermingham||1262||1307||Died
|-
|Rickard de Bermingham||1307||1322||
|-
|rowspan=3|Baron Kingsale (1223)||Edmund de Courcy, 4th Baron Kingsale||1290||1302||Died
|-
|John de Courcy, 5th Baron Kingsale||1302||1303||Died
|-
|Miles de Courcy, 6th Baron Kingsale||1303||1338||
|-
|rowspan=2|Baron Kerry (1223)||Maurice Fitzthomas Fitzmaurice, 2nd Baron Kerry||1260||1303||Died
|-
|Nicholas Fitzmaurice, 3rd Baron Kerry||1303||1324||
|-
|Baron Barry (1261)||John Barry, 4th Baron Barry||1290||1330||
|-
|}

References

 

Lists of peers by decade
1300s in England
1300s in Ireland
14th century in Scotland
14th-century English people
14th-century Irish people
14th-century Scottish earls
1300 in Europe
14th century in England
14th century in Ireland
Peers